Mercer v Alternative Future Group Ltd [2021] IRLR 620 is a UK labour law case, concerning the right to strike for fair wages and to not be subjected to detriment.

Facts 
Mercer was suspended after organising strikes for better wages as a trade union representative in her workplace at the Alternative Futures Group, a charity with the slogan "Amazing people... doing amazing things... every day". The employer claimed strike action was not protected from detriment under TULRCA 1992 section 146, which did not extend to strikes by its reference to the "appropriate time". Mercer argued it was necessary to protect strike action among other things to comply with the right to strike and freedom of association in ECHR article 11.

The Tribunal held that an interpretation of section 146 to cover detriment for strike action would go against the "legislative scheme". The Secretary of State intervened on the employer's side.

Judgment
Choudhury J held that TULRCA 1992 section 146 could be interpreted compatibly with ECHR article 11, to protect the right to industrial action. Although on a proper construction protection fell for strike action fell under section 152, not section 146, it could be possible to effectively add a new sub paragraph (c) that time in working hours on strike was protected. To permit disciplinary action against workers simply for exercising the right to strike would fundamentally contradict the ECtHR authorities.

See also
UK labour law

Notes

References

External links
Alternative Futures Group website

United Kingdom labour case law